Hiraide Dam is a gravity dam located in Gunma Prefecture in Japan. The dam is used for power production. The catchment area of the dam is 635.3 km2. The dam impounds about 16  ha of land when full and can store 1400 thousand cubic meters of water. The construction of the dam was started on 1960 and completed in 1964.

References

Dams in Gunma Prefecture